Eupithecia brunneilutea is a moth in the family Geometridae. It is found in south-western China (Yunnan) and Nepal.

The fore- and hindwings are creamy white.

References

Moths described in 2004
brunneilutea
Moths of Asia